Adam Torres may refer to:

 Adam Torres (Degrassi: The Next Generation), a character on Degrassi: The Next Generation
 Adam Torres (singer), American singer and songwriter